Vetulicolia is a phylum of animals encompassing several extinct species belonging to the Cambrian Period. The phylum was created by Degan Shu and his research team in 2001, and named after Vetulicola cuneata, the first species of the phylum described in 1987. The vetulicolian body comprises two parts: a voluminous anterior forebody, tipped with an anteriorly positioned mouth and lined with a row of five round to oval-shaped features on each lateral side, which have been interpreted as gills (or at least openings in the vicinity of the pharynx); and a posterior section that primitively comprises seven segments and functions as a tail. All vetulicolians lack preserved appendages of any kind, having no legs, feelers or even eyes. The area where the anterior and posterior parts join is constricted.

Their affinity has been uncertain; they have been considered to represent stem- and crown-group arthropods, stem-group vertebrates, and early deuterostomes. The general scientific consensus before 2001 considered them early limbless arthropods but now considers them early deuterostomes. Vetulicolian fossils examined in 2014 show the presence of notochord-like structures, and it was concluded that vetulicolians are crown-group chordates and probably the sister group of modern tunicates. Research from 2017 rather indicates vetulicolians are related to Saccorhytus, another basal deuterostome group, although another study shows possibility that Saccorhytus is ecdysozoan instead of deuterostome.

Taxonomy and evolution 

Vetulicolia as a phylum was created by Chinese palaeontologist Degan Shu and his research team at the Northwest University in Xi'an, China, along with Simon Conway Morris at the University of Cambridge in 2001. The name was derived from Vetulicola cuneata, the first species described by Xian-guang Hou in 1987 from the Lower Cambrian Chiungchussu Formation in Chengjiang, China. The purpose was to include all related Cambrian animals known under the families Didazoonidae (Didazoon, Pomatrum, and Xidazoon) and  Vetulicolidae (Vetulicola, and Banffia) as a separate group of animals. Other animals which may be related include the yunnanozoans.

The taxonomic placement of the vetulicolians remains controversial. The original researcher Shu is of the opinion that the vetulicolians probably represent an early side-branch of deuterostomes, and that this implies that segmentation in cephalochordates and vertebrates may be derived from the common ancestor of protostomes and deuterostomes. However, Derek Briggs of Yale University and his team who described Skeemella from the Middle Cambrian of Utah regard it as having affinity to protosomes with important arthropod features, thus confounding assignment of Vetulicolia to Deuterostomia. Thurston C. Lacalli of the University of Saskatchewan, Saskatoon, Canada, agreed to the deuterostome position, but suggested that the animals were more likely related to tunicates.

Dominguez and Jefferies have argued, based on morphological analysis, that Vetulicola (and by implication, other vetulicolians) is a urochordate, and probably a stem-group larvacean. Some question the relation to tunicates and larvaceans, as there is no evidence of segmentation in tunicates, larval or adult, that is comparable to segmentation in vetulicolians, that the anus of urochordates is within the atrium, while that of vetulicolians is positioned at the terminal end of the tail, and, perhaps most importantly, there is no exhalant siphon, or analogous structure, seen in vetulicolians. However, a discovery of new vetulicolian, Nesonektris aldridgei, from Australia in 2014 supported a position close to urochordates for vetulicolians.

The monophyly of Deuterostomia is not strongly supported. If deuterostomes are paraphyletic, pharyngeal slits were probably present in the common ancestor of Bilateria and vetulicolians may be stem-group protostomes that retained the ancestral pharyngeal slits. If this is the case, banffids, which appear to lack pharyngeal slits, may be more closely related to crown-group protostomes than other vetulicolians.

Ecology and lifestyle 
From their superficially tadpole-like forms, leaf or paddle-shaped tails, and various degrees of streamlining, it is assumed that all vetulicolians discovered thus far were swimming animals that spent much, if not all, of their time living in the water column. Some groups, like the genus Vetulicola, were more streamlined (complete with ventral keels) than other groups, such as the tadpole-like Didazoonidae.

Because all vetulicolians had mouths which had no features for chewing or grasping, it is automatically assumed that they were not predators. Since vetulicolians possessed gill slits, many researchers regard these organisms as planktivores. The sediment infills in the guts of their fossils have led some to suggest that they were deposit feeders. This idea has been contested, as deposit feeders tend to have straight guts, whereas the hindguts of vetulicolians were spiral-shaped. Some researchers propose that the vetulicolians were "selective deposit-feeders" which actively swam from one region of the seafloor to another, while supplementing their nutrition with filter-feeding.

Classification 
 Superphylum Deuterostomia
 Phylum Vetulicolia
 Class Vetulicolida
 Genus Nesonektris
 N. aldridgei
 Genus Shenzianyuloma
 S. yunnanense
 Family Vetulicolidae
 Genus Vetulicola
 V. rectangulata
 V. cuneata
 V. gangtoucunensis
 V. monile
 V. longbaoshanensis
 Genus Ooedigera
 O. peeli
 Genus Yuyuanozoon
 Y. magnificissimi
 Family Beidazooidae
 Genus Beidazoon
 B. venustum (synonym = Bullivetula variola)
 Family Didazoonidae
 Genus Didazoon
 D. haoae
 Genus Pomatrum (=Xidazoon)
 P. ventralis (Xidazoon stephanus)
 Yunnanozoon lividum
 ?Class Banffozoa
 Genus Skeemella
 Sk. clavula
 Family Banffiidae
 Genus Banffia
 B. constricta
 B. episoma
 Class Heteromorphida
 Family Heteromorphidae
 Genus Heteromorphus
 H. longicaudatus (synonym=Banffia confusa)
 "Form A" (unnamed species)

Notes

References

External links 

 New phylum on the block – Accessed January 3, 2008
 Photos and drawings of fossils of various Vetulicolians – Accessed January 3, 2008

 
Animal phyla
Cambrian first appearances
Extinct animals